The 1920–21 season was the 21st season of competitive football in Belgium.

Overview
Daring Club de Bruxelles won the Division I. At the end of the season, only one club was relegated to the Promotion (Uccle Sport) and 3 clubs promoted to the Division I (Standard Club Liégeois, FC Malinois and SC Anderlechtois), so that the number of clubs in Division I increased from 12 to 14.

National team

* Belgium score given first

Key
 H = Home match
 A = Away match
 N = On neutral ground
 F = Friendly
 OQF = Summer Olympics quarter finals
 OSF = Summer Olympics semi-finals
 OF = Summer Olympics final
 o.g. = own goal

Honours

Final league tables

Division I

Promotion

External links
RSSSF archive - Final tables 1895-2002
Belgian clubs history